Alfredo Stéfano Di Stéfano Laulhé (4 July 1926 – 7 July 2014) was a professional footballer and coach who played as a forward, regarded as one of the greatest footballers of all time. Nicknamed "Saeta rubia" ("Blond Arrow"), he is best known for his achievements with Real Madrid, where he was instrumental in the club's domination of the European Cup and La Liga during the 1950s and 1960s. Along with Francisco Gento and José María Zárraga, he was one of only three players to play a part in all five European Cup victories, scoring goals in each of the five finals. Di Stéfano played international football mostly for Spain after moving to Madrid, but he also played for Argentina and Colombia.

Di Stéfano began his career at Argentina's River Plate aged 17, in 1943. For the 1946 season he was loaned to Club Atlético Huracán, but he returned to River in 1947. Due to a footballers' strike in Argentina in 1949, Di Stéfano went to play for Millonarios of Bogotá in the Colombian league. He won six league titles during the first 12 years of his career in Argentina and Colombia. Following his signing by Real Madrid he was an integral part of one of the most successful teams of all time. He scored 216 league goals in 282 games for Real (then a club record, since surpassed by Raúl, Cristiano Ronaldo and Karim Benzema), striking up a successful partnership with Ferenc Puskás. Di Stéfano's 49 goals in 58 matches was the all-time highest tally in the European Cup. The record has since been surpassed by several players, including the aforementioned Real Madrid trio. Di Stéfano scored in five consecutive European Cup finals for Real Madrid between 1956 and 1960, including a hat-trick in the last. Perhaps, the highlight of his time with the club was their 7–3 victory over Eintracht Frankfurt in the 1960 final at Hampden Park, a game many consider to be the finest exhibition of club football ever witnessed in Europe. He moved to Espanyol in 1964 and played there until retiring at the age of 40.

Di Stéfano was awarded the Ballon d'Or for the European Footballer of the Year in 1957 and 1959. He is currently the sixth highest scorer in the history of Spain's top division, and Real Madrid's third highest league goalscorer of all time. He is Madrid's leading goalscorer in the history of El Clásico, alongside Cristiano Ronaldo. In November 2003, to celebrate UEFA's Jubilee, he was selected as the Golden Player of Spain by the Royal Spanish Football Federation as their most outstanding player of the past 50 years. He was voted fourth, behind Pelé, Diego Maradona, and Johan Cruyff, in a vote organized by France Football magazine which consulted their former Ballon d'Or winners to elect the Football Player of the Century. In 2004, he was named by Pelé in the FIFA 100 list of the world's greatest living players (in September 2009, he said Di Stéfano was the best player "ever"). In 2008 Di Stéfano was honoured by both UEFA and Real Madrid with a special Presidents' award issued by FIFA at a ceremony in Madrid, where a statue was also unveiled. Then UEFA President Michel Platini called Di Stéfano "a great amongst the greats" while contemporaries Eusébio and Just Fontaine suggested that he was "the most complete footballer in the history of the game".

Early life

Born in Barracas, a neighborhood of Buenos Aires, Di Stéfano was the son of Alfredo Di Stéfano, a first-generation Italian Argentine (his father Michele emigrated to Argentina from Nicolosi in the 19th century), and Eulalia Laulhé Gilmont, an Argentine woman of French and Irish descent with her relatives being from Swinford, County Mayo.

Di Stéfano's father, who was a former defender of River Plate, but prematurely retired in 1912 due to a knee injury, introduced young Alfredo to football. Di Stéfano grew up playing street football, in oratories and in neighbourhood teams such as the Barracas "Unidos y Venceremos", and the Imán of the Flores district. People already had noticed his talent. But, in 1940 his family moved to the countryside and Di Stéfano started working with his father and playing football with his brother Tulio for Club Social y Deportivo Unión Progresista until 1943, when the family returned to Buenos Aires.

Club career

River Plate

In 1944 Di Stéfano's father wrote a letter of recommendation to River Plate, and the club sent a reply telegram to invite him to an audition with the youth team. Di Stéfano impressed on the trial and joined the second team squad of River Plate, the club his family supported. The next year he became part of the first team which was called La Máquina due to their unprecedented success, consisting of players like Pedernera, Labruna Muñoz, and Loustau. One of the main stars of the team, Moreno, had just left for the Mexican Real Club España and it seemed like a good opportunity for the young Di Stéfano to fight for a place on the first squad.

Di Stéfano, whose idol was Paraguayan Arsenio Erico, the Independiente striker, learned from the big stars, especially Pedernera. His coach and first mentor Carlos Peucelle taught him how to play the ball low and soon he made his first team debut in 1945, at the age of 19: on 15 July of that year he debuted against Huracán in a 2–1 defeat on the twelfth day of the 1945 Argentine championship. This was the only game Di Stéfano played in that year, but at the end of the season he won his first title as River Plate won the championship, four points ahead of Boca Juniors.

Loaned to Huracán

During the only match Di Stéfano played in the previous season, the president of Huracán was impressed by his potential; Di Stéfano agreed to join them, as he realised his chances of making the first team for River Plate were limited. Huracán and Argentina legend Herminio Masantonio had just retired and the club needed a replacement forward.

Former Argentine striker and World Cup top scorer Guillermo Stábile, the Huracán and Argentina national team coach at the time, gave Di Stéfano his first real opportunities in the 1946 season. He scored the first two goals of his career in a 3–1 victory against Estudiantes (LP). 

He later scored against his former team River Plate, netting the fastest goal in the history of the Argentine championship after about ten seconds of play. He would score 10 goals in 25 appearances for Huracan, teaming up perfectly with Norberto Méndez who would later become the all-time top scorer in Copa América. Huracán tried to sign Di Stéfano permanently at the end of a successful eighth-place season, but could not afford the 90,000 pesos River Plate asked for the transfer.

Return to River Plate 1947–1949

Upon his return to River Plate, Di Stéfano became an integral part of La Máquina, taking on the role of the departing Adolfo Pedernera who had signed for Club Atlético Atlanta. Carlos Peucelle initially put Di Stéfano on the flank, a position in which Di Stéfano struggled; in a game against Atlanta of Pedernera, Peucelle decided to use him as a center forward and River eventually won 6–1. Soon, Di Stéfano imposed himself as the center forward and his teammates adapted to his game. He received the nickname of Saeta Rubia from journalist Roberto Neuberger. Though he had to leave the team for some time due to compulsory conscription, Di Stéfano contributed significantly to winning the 1947 Argentine Primera División, becoming the top scorer of the league with 27 goals.

The league victory gave River Plate the right to represent Argentina in the Copa Aldao against the champions of Uruguay Nacional Montevideo who featured great player like goalkeeper Anibal Paz and Walter Taibo in a two-nation club competition that tracked origins to 1913 and for many it was considered the precursor to the Copa Libertadores. In November 1947, River beat Nacional 4–3 with Di Stéfano scoring one goal in Montevideo, and four days later Di Stéfano celebrated his first international club trophy with a 3–1 victory in Buenos Aires.

In February 1948, champions River Plate participated in the inaugural South American Championship of Champions in Santiago facing the other South American champions, finishing second behind Vasco da Gama with Di Stéfano scoring 4 goals in 6 games. During the Argentine championship of 1948, the Football Association suspended the tournament for a short time due to the protests of players led by Adolfo Pedernera and Alfredo Di Stéfano that resulted in a player's strike in a bid to gain professional status and rights. Despite that upheaval Di Stéfano scored 13 goals in 23 games and River Plate finished third. The strike lasted for 8 months until 1949 and it eventually meant the departure of the best Argentine footballers to other leagues, in particular Colombia's, which was one of the most lucrative in the world at the time.

In one of his last games in Argentina, on 31 July 1949, Di Stéfano played in the role of goalkeeper, replacing the owner Amadeo Carrizo for a few minutes and keeping the clean sheet in a derby won against Boca Juniors.

Millonarios 1949–1953
After the Superga air disaster, in May 1949, a friendly match between River Plate and Grande Torino was played and Di Stéfano was promised to the Granata. However the Argentine forward was soon after contacted by Adolfo Pedernera, who had already agreed to terms with the Colombian Bogota-based club Millonarios F.C. On 9 August 1949, after another one of his teammates, Néstor Rossi signed for the Colombian club without River Plate receiving any compensation for the transfer. Di Stéfano signed with the Colombians. Millonarios, who could not afford to pay the transfer fees anyhow, offered him a salary clearly higher than that at River Plate, and the Argentine forward started a new chapter in his career in Colombia, in period called El Dorado. Many international stars like the Hungarians Béla Sárosi, László Szőke, the Argentines René Pontoni, Héctor Rial, Englishman Charlie Mitten from Manchester United for 5,000 pounds a year, Neil Franklin from Stoke City, French-Hungarian Ferenc Nyers, Italian Luigi Di Franco, the Brazilian Heleno de Freitas, and others had joined the league after Pedernera first signed.

The Colombian league had turned professional in 1948, beginning the El Dorado period on 25 April 1949. Di Stéfano, Perdenera, and Nestor Rossi who joined Millonarios in the summer, formed part of the famous team called the Ballet Azul that won their first title ever beating Deportivo Cali in the 1949 final, with Di Stéfano scoring 16 goals in 14 games. Di Stéfano scored 23 goals in 29 games the following 1950 season, but Millonarios finished 2 points behind eventual champions Deportes Caldas. Di Stéfano, who kept himself in excellent condition, excelled during his games and led Millonarios to a second title in 1951, leaving runners-up Boca Juniors de Cali 11 points behind at the final table. Di Stéfano scored 32 goals in 34 games, more than any other player in the league. Millonarios would go on to lose the 1951 Copa Colombia (played in 1952) to Boca Juniors de Cali.

The 1952 league had the same outcome: Milionarios overtook Boca Juniors de Cali, won their third title, and Di Stéfano was once again top scorer with 19 goals. In October 1952, Di Stéfano also led Millonarios to the Copa Colombia final after beating Cúcuta Deportivo by 2–1. The final would be played in May 1953, after Di Stéfano had already gone to Argentina.

In October 1951 the División Mayor del Fútbol Profesional Colombiano agreed to the Pacto de Lima with FIFA, with the requirement that foreign players would return to their countries after October 1954. Di Stéfano scored a total of 267 goals in 292 games for Milionarios, and is considered one of the best footballers in the history of the Colombian League.

The disputed transfer to Spain
In March 1952, Real Madrid organized a friendly tournament in the Spanish capital at its newly constructed home ground; River Plate was invited to participate in Real Madrid's 50th-anniversary tournament. The tournament was called Bodas de Oro, but once Real Madrid's Santiago Bernabeu heard about the new powerhouse in South America, Real Madrid cancelled the invitation to River Plate and invited the Colombians as the South American representative. The Colombians participated in the tournament and won it, after drawing 2–2 with Swedish champions IFK Norrköping and overcoming Los Blancos, who were managed by Uruguayan legend Hector Scarone, by a 4–2 margin with a brace from Saeta Rubia in the presence of President Santiago Bernabéu, who arrived to the stadium to observe Adolfo Pedernera. Millonarios would start a global tour and spearheaded by Di Stéfano, they would beat Hungary and world champions Uruguay.

Soon after Millonarios' return to Colombia, the Barcelona directors visited Buenos Aires and agreed with River Plate, the last FIFA-affiliated team to have held Di Stéfano's rights, for his transfer in 1954 for the equivalent of 150 million Italian lira (according to other sources 200,000 dollars). This started a battle between the two Spanish rivals for his rights. In Christmas 1952, Di Stéfano, still contracted with Millonarios, returned briefly to Buenos Aires, where he was even making plans to abandon football and start a business as the Argentine league was still not professional.

FIFA appointed Armando Muñoz Calero, former president of the Spanish Football Federation as mediator. Calero decided to let Di Stéfano play the 1953–54 and 1955–56 seasons in Madrid, and the 1954–55 and 1955–56 seasons in Barcelona. The agreement was approved by the Football Association and their respective clubs. Although the Catalans agreed, the decision created various discontent among the Blaugrana members and the president was forced to resign in September 1953.

Barcelona sold Madrid their half-share, and Di Stéfano moved to the Blancos signing a four-year contract. Real paid 5.5 million Spanish pesetas for the transfer, plus a 1.3 million bonus for the purchase, an annual fee to be paid to the Millonarios, and a 16,000 salary for Di Stéfano with a bonus double that of his teammates, for a total of 40% of the annual revenue of the Madrid club. This fact contributed greatly to intensifying the rivalry with Barcelona.

Real Madrid: The first European triumph

A 27-year-old Di Stéfano arrived at Real Madrid on 22 September 1953, after seven months of inactivity, and made his debut with the white jersey five days later, scoring his first goal for Real Madrid in a 4–2 home win against Racing de Santander. On 25 October 1953, Di Stéfano played in his first Clásico against champions Barcelona, just a few hours after the Catalonian team had sold his share on the Argentinian, and Di Stéfano contributed two goals in a 5–0 win. In his first several months in Madrid, the Argentine champion did not adapt to European football, but imposed his own style, playing all around the field with speed and keeping the ball low on the ground. Highlights of his first season included two match-winning performances against city rivals Atlético Madrid, with a hat-trick in a 5–0 away win in November 1953, and scoring the two goals in a 5–0 home comeback in February 1954. The Blancos managed to win the Spanish championship after two decades, with Di Stéfano contributing two hat-tricks in the last two home games of the season, including the decisive 4–0 win against Valencia that secured the title victory. His late goalscoring run made Di Stéfano the top scorer of 1953–54 La Liga with 27 goals in 28 appearances, beating Barcelona's László Kubala by three goals.

The following year, Real Madrid acquired Argentine Héctor Rial from the Nacional Montevideo, a signing recommended by Di Stéfano, for the attack of the Merengues. Despite the surprise sacking of manager Enrique Fernández halfway through the season, the club won another league title in 1955 with José Villalonga, leaving Barcelona again in the second place of the table. Di Stéfano scored 25 goals, finishing behind only Juan Arza (28) among the scorers of the Spanish league. On 26 June 1955, Los Blancos won their first ever Latin Cup, beating Raymond Kopa and Just Fontaine's Stade de Reims in the Paris final 2–0.

The second consecutive Spanish title allowed Real Madrid to be the first Spanish representative in the inaugural European Cup in the 1955–56 season. Di Stéfano made his European Cup debut against Servette in a 2–0 away win. In the league he was again the top scorer with 24 goals, but despite that, Athletic Bilbao won the tournament ahead of Barça and Real. In the European Cup, the team had their way eliminating the Swiss and later Partizan Belgrade, after a suffering a 3–0 defeat in Yugoslavia. With the guidance of Di Stéfano they had an easy 4–0 victory in Madrid in the first leg, in December 1956. Real Madrid flew to Belgrade and despite the snowstorm that had hit the city in the previous days, the president Bernabéu agreed for the match not to be postponed. Unlike the Spaniards, the Partizan players did not suffer on the terrain, taking the lead and dominating the game. A penalty was awarded to Real Madrid, but Héctor Rial slipped when kicking and missed it. In the final minutes with the Serbians up by 3–0, Di Stéfano helped in defending and Real qualified despite a clear defeat. The Blancos eliminated Milan in the semi-finals 6–4 on aggregate and entered the final in Paris against Raymond Kopa and Just Fontaine's Stade de Reims. Real Madrid suffered in the first half, but Di Stéfano carried his teammates in a comeback to win the trophy 4–3. At the end of the year, on 18 December 1956, the first Ballon d'Or was awarded, and Di Stéfano missed on winning it by just 3 votes to Stanley Matthews of English club Blackpool.

Naturalisation and the building of an empire
During the summer of 1956, Real Madrid signed Raymond Kopa from the Stade de Reims. The French forward could not feature in the games due to the limit of foreigners in La Liga and had to wait for the Spanish naturalisation of Di Stèfano, who became a Spanish citizen in October 1956.

The season started early with the participation of Real Madrid in the Small World Cup in Caracas, Venezuela as European champions. The Spaniards faced Vasco da Gama, AS Roma and FC Porto playing against players like World Cup winner Alcides Ghiggia and Vavá. Real won the trophy with 3 wins and Di Stéfano finished as top scorer of the tournament with 4 goals (same as Vavá).

As Real Madrid did not win the title in the previous season, president Santiago Bernabéu, who also served as the vice-president of the competition, came up with the idea that the European Cup winner had the right to register for the next edition to defend the title even if they had failed to win the domestic league. Consequently, Real participated in the 1956–57 season, eliminating Rapid Vienna, Nice, and Manchester United in the semi-finals before beating Fiorentina 2–0 in the final, in Madrid. During the season, Real also asserted itself in the last edition of the Latin Cup, overcoming Benfica 1–0 in the final with a decisive goal by Di Stéfano. At the end of the year, he won the 1957 Ballon d'Or. From the twenty-third day of the 1956–57 La Liga, Real Madrid started a series of consecutive victorious home results that ended only in 1966, at the twenty-fifth round of the Liga, after 121 matches. The Blancos attack was one of the best in history and boasted Di Stéfano, Héctor Rial, Francisco Gento and Kopa. Real won the league title in 1957 and Di Stéfano was again the top scorer with 31 goals.

In the following season, Real Madrid was further strengthened with the arrival of Uruguayan José Santamaría in defense. Di Stéfano scored 19 goals and won the top scorer award, obtaining the 1957–58 league title at the expense of Atlético Madrid. In the quarter-finals of the European Cup, Real Madrid faced Sevilla FC, humiliating their opponents in the first leg in Madrid with an 8–0 victory, where Di Stéfano scored four goals. In the return leg in Seville, Di Stéfano was greeted by the insulting choruses of opposing fans and Real were held to a 2–2 draw. In the semi-finals, Di Stèfano contributed to the success against the Hungarian Vasas and the team reached the final against Juan Alberto Schiaffino's Milan. Real Madrid won the final with a 3–2 comeback victory, and the Argentine finished the tournament as the top scorer with 10 goals.

The season finished with the loss of the 1958 Generalísimo Cup in the final to Athletic Bilbao, 0–2. As a result, Ferenc Puskás signed with Real Madrid in the summer of 1958 to strengthen the squad and Real Madrid would be blessed with one of the most lethal attacking pairs in the history of football. Nevertheless, Real ended up second in the 1958–59 season behind Barça, with Di Stéfano finishing as the best scorer in the league for the fifth and last time, and the fourth in a row, with 23 goals.

After overcoming rivals Atlético Madrid in three games in the semi-finals, Real Madrid won its fourth consecutive European Cup by defeating Stade de Reims (as three years ago) by a score of 2–0. During the final, Enrique Mateos, substituting for Puskás (the Hungarian feared retaliation and decided not to depart with the tam for the final in Stuttgart), took a penalty instead of Di Stéfano and missed it. At the beginning of the second half, Di Stéfano scored the second goal to seal the victory.

On 16 July 1959, Real Madrid hosted a match against Pelé and his Brazilian club, Santos FC, during their European tour. It was one of the most anticipated games of the tour, given the reputation that Pelé had started building. Di Stéfano's team would beat the Brazilians 5–3. In December, France Football awarded Di Stéfano the 1959 Ballon d'Or, which he won ahead of teammate Raymond Kopa (who had already returned to Stade de Reims in the summer of 1959) and Juventus's Welsh star John Charles. Puskás and Gento both finished in the top ten.

During the 1959–60 season, the Madrilenos signed the Brazilian midfielder Didi who was a 1958 World Cup winner, the tournament best player and former teammate of Garrincha and Pelé. Given that the Brazilian's style of play was similar to Di Stéfano's, Didi often clashed with the Argentine and there were rumours that he asked for his release from the club's management in the summer of 1960. But with Didi in the squad, the Blancos won their fifth consecutive European Cup. After eliminating Barcelona in the semi-finals, Real Madrid played in the final at the Hampden Park in Glasgow in front of 135,000 spectators against Eintracht Frankfurt. Di Stéfano and Puskás scored three and four goals, respectively, in a game considered to be among the finest in the history of football. Di Stéfano scored 8 goals in the tournament, finishing second in the scorers' chart won by Puskás. In the 1959–60 league season, Real finished equal with Barcelona on points, but the Catalonians were the ones to be awarded the title on a goal average tie-breaker. Di Stéfano did not win the Pichichi award as Puskás was the league top scorer with 25 goals. Real Madrid lost the Generalísimo Cup final to Atlético Madrid 3–1 at home on 26 June 1960.

European decline and the first domestic double
The new season started with the inaugural Intercontinental Cup and the 0–0 draw in the first leg of the final against Peñarol in Montevideo on 4 July. In the return leg, however, Real beat the Uruguayans 5–1 with Di Stéfano scoring one goal on 4 September 1960. On 13 December 1960, Di Stéfano came fourth in the Ballon d'Or voting, and for the first time in history, Real Madrid were knocked out of the European Cup, losing 3–4 on aggregate against Barcelona after a controversial second leg. Madrid, however, regrouped and easily won La Liga by a great margin over runners-up Atlético Madrid, but lost the final of the Generalísimo Cup again to Rojiblancos, 2–3. Di Stéfano finished the season with 21 goals, being the second-highest scorer in the league behind Puskás who netted 28 goals.

In the 1961–62 season, Di Stéfano won the domestic double for the first time, clinching the Generalísimo Cup 15 years since the last time Real Madrid had won the trophy, after beating Sevilla 2–1 in the final with two goals from Puskás to overturn the initial red and white advantage. Di Stéfano finished 6th in the Ballon d'Or voting in December. In the 1961–62 European Cup, Real reached the final for the sixth time in seven seasons, after eliminating Juventus and Standard Liège. In the showpiece, Madrid played against defending champions Benfica and though the Spaniards took the lead twice, in the second half of the game the Lusitanians cruised to successfully retaining their title with a thrilling 5–3 victory, courtesy of Eusébio. Real Madrid lost its first European Cup final, and for the first time Di Stéfano failed to score (the three goals were scored by Puskás). Nevertheless, Di Stéfano was among the best scorers of the competition for the second time in his career, with 7 goals.

In the autumn of 1962, the Blancos were eliminated in the 1962–63 European Cup preliminary round by Anderlecht. However, with Di Stéfano at the age of 37, Real won the 1962–63 league title over Atlético Madrid, with Puskás finishing as the top scorer once again.

The 1963–64 season was the last for Di Stéfano at Real Madrid. At the beginning of the season, the team had an exhibition tour in Venezuela as they participated in the Small Club World Cup against São Paulo and FC Porto. Di Stéfano played on the first match on 20 August, but on 24 August the Argentine champion was kidnapped by the National Liberation Armed Forces of Venezuela in the Potomac hotel in Caracas, and was released by them three days later, unharmed. The incident cost the Los Blancos the trophy as without Di Stéfano they could not overcome São Paulo in the final game. The season, however, went on to be quite successful, with the Blancos clinching their fourth consecutive league title and returning to the European Cup final, having defeated AC Milan in the quarter-finals 4–3 on aggregate along the way. In the final, Madrid faced Helenio Herrera's Inter Milan. Hours before the final, Di Stéfano explicitly criticized the tactics designed by Real Madrid head coach Miguel Muñoz against Italian defender Giacinto Facchetti. The relationship between Muñoz, who had the support of President Bernabéu, and the Argentine player was already frayed. Inter won the final 3–1.

Real Madrid career in numbers
Di Stéfano played for Real Madrid for 11 years, winning 8 Spanish championships, 1 Spanish Cup, 2 Latin Cups, 5 consecutive Champions Cups (scoring in all the finals he won), 1 Intercontinental Cup, several individual titles including league top scorer 5 times. He scored 418 goals in 510 games, of which 308 goals in 396 official matches (49 goals in 59 matches in the Champions Cup), becoming the best scorer in the history of the club, until that record was surpassed several decades later first by Raúl and then by Cristiano Ronaldo (the current record goalscorer) and Karim Benzema.

Espanyol
After the Champions Cup final loss in 1964 against Inter Milan, president Santiago Bernabéu offered Di Stéfano a place on the Real Madrid coaching staff instead of renewing the player's contract. Di Stéfano refused Bernabéu's proposal and he moved to Real Espanyol.

The Argentine veteran scored 9 goals in all competitions in his first season with Espanyol, putting an end to a streak of 15 consecutive seasons in which he scored in double figures (18 total). After 14 goals in 60 matches with Espanyol, he retired as a player at 40 in 1966, helping his team avoid relegation in both seasons. Despite what was previously stated, Bernabéu decided to give Di Stéfano a farewell match against Celtic in Madrid, to honour him for his services.

International career
Di Stéfano played with three different national teams during his career, scoring 6 goals in 6 appearances for Argentina, and 23 in 31 appearances for Spain. However, he never played in the World Cup. Di Stéfano also played four times for Colombia, during the Dimayor period of Colombian football. The team at the time was not recognised by FIFA as the league had broken transfer rules in signing players while still under contract.

Argentina

Di Stéfano made his international debut on 4 December 1947, in a match against Bolivia at the Estadio George Capwell in Ecuador, during the 1947 South American Championship. He scored his first international goal in that same match, helping Argentina to a 7–0 win. Di Stéfano scored five more goals during the championship – including his first hat-trick against Colombia – as Argentina successfully defended the title they had won the previous year on home soil.

Di Stéfano's six games during that tournament would prove to be his only appearances for Argentina. Player strikes, and a dispute with the Brazilian Football Confederation, forced Argentina to withdraw from qualifying for the 1950 FIFA World Cup in Brazil, as well as the 1949 and 1953 South American Championships. By the time qualifying began for the 1954 FIFA World Cup, FIFA had banned Di Stéfano from making any further appearances for Argentina, on account of his appearances for the Colombia XI two years earlier – though Argentina once again pulled out of qualifying.

1949 Colombia XI 
After moving to Bogota in 1949, during a break in the Colombian League in 1951, friendly matches were organised under the name of combined XI of the Colombian league. Di Stéfano – without ever holding a Colombian passport – made four appearances for the Colombian XI team, which did not appear in the official records of FIFA.

Spain

Di Stéfano was widely loved in Spain, and having been banned from playing for Argentina, it made sense for Di Stéfano to play for Spain. FIFA initially refused to sanction this, but after Di Stéfano acquired Spanish citizenship in 1956, and amid pressure from the Spanish FA, the decision was eventually reversed. Di Stéfano consequently made his debut for Spain on 30 January 1957 in a friendly against the Netherlands in Madrid, scoring a hat-trick in a 5–1 win to become one of a number of players born outside Spain to have appeared for their national team.

The Spanish team, with a forward line also boasting Barcelona and Real Madrid stars Laszlo Kubala, Luis Suárez and Francisco Gento, were favourites to qualify for the 1958 FIFA World Cup in Sweden, having been drawn into a qualification group with Scotland and minnows Switzerland. However, Spain began their campaign with a 2–2 draw against the Swiss and then lost to Scotland at Hampden Park 4–2. Spain won both of the reverse fixtures 4–1, but the damage had already been done: Scotland beat Switzerland in their final match and qualified at Spain's expense. Di Stéfano, who had played in all four games and scored two goals, missed out yet again.

In 1961, at the age of 35, Di Stéfano finally qualified for a World Cup, helping Spain qualify for the 1962 edition in Chile. A muscular injury just before the competition prevented him from playing in the finals, but Di Stéfano travelled with the squad anyway, picking the number 6 jersey as his preferred number 9 was taken by Gento. Spain boasted the likes of José Santamaría and Ferenc Puskás – both also naturalised citizens, and who had, coincidentally, represented their respective home countries in the 1954 tournament – but with Di Stéfano sidelined, they failed to make it out of the group stage, losing to Didi's Brazil in their final game and finishing at the bottom of their group. Di Stéfano retired from international football after the tournament.

Managerial career

After retirement, Di Stéfano moved into coaching. He guided Argentine club Boca Juniors to win two titles, the 1969 Nacional when the team won the Nacional championship. and the 1969 Copa Argentina.

After his successful run in Argentina, Di Stéfano returned to Spain winning La Liga and the European Cup Winners' Cup with Valencia. He also managed Sporting in the 1974–75 season.

In 1981 Di Stefano was hired as coach of River Plate, the club where he had debuted as player. With Mario Kempes as the star player of the team, Di Stéfano leaded River Plate to win the 1981 Nacional championship.

Di Stéfano was also coach of Real Madrid between 1982 and 1984. In the 1982–83 season, they finished second in La Liga and were defeated in the finals of the Supercopa de España, Copa de la Liga, and Copa del Rey. Madrid also reached the European Cup Winners' Cup final that season, but were also beaten by Aberdeen, managed by Alex Ferguson. The team also finished second in the La Liga of next season again. He also returned to Valencia in 1986 to guide them back to La Liga by winning the Segunda Division after their relegation the season prior before his arrival.

After retirement
Di Stéfano resided in Spain until his death in 2014. On 5 November 2000 he was named Honorary President of Real Madrid.

On 24 December 2005, 79-year-old Di Stéfano suffered a heart attack.

On 9 May 2006, the Alfredo Di Stéfano Stadium was inaugurated at the City of Real Madrid, where Real Madrid usually train. Its inaugural match was a friendly between Real Madrid and Stade de Reims, a rematch of the European Cup final won by Real Madrid in 1956. Real Madrid won 6–1 with goals from Sergio Ramos, Antonio Cassano (2), Roberto Soldado (2) and José Manuel Jurado.

Style of play

Regarded as a very strong player, Di Stéfano was a powerful, quick, skillful, and prolific goalscorer, with great stamina, tactical versatility, creativity, and vision, who could play almost anywhere on the pitch. He is arguably one of the greatest dribblers ever to set foot on a pitch. He was highly proficient in using feints to get past defenders and create chances, and volleys as well as bicycle kicks to score dynamic goals.

Death

Following another heart attack on 5 July 2014, the 88-year-old Di Stéfano was moved to intensive care in the Gregorio Marañón hospital in Madrid, where he died on 7 July 2014.

On 8 July, Di Stéfano's coffin was placed on public display at the Bernabéu Stadium. Real Madrid president Florentino Pérez and captain Iker Casillas were amongst those in attendance. Following his death Di Stéfano received tributes from many famous football personalities including Alex Ferguson, Pelé, Cristiano Ronaldo, Diego Maradona, and Bobby Charlton. 

During the 2014 FIFA World Cup semi-final between Argentina and the Netherlands on 9 July, Di Stéfano was honoured with one minute of silence, while the Argentine team also wore black ribbons in a matter of respect.

River Plate and Millonarios organized a friendly match in homage of their former player. The match was played on 16 July 2014, at Millonarios' Estadio El Campín.

In September 2017, a street near Real Madrid's training complex was named after Di Stéfano for the 64th anniversary of his debut.

Personal life
Di Stéfano married Sara Freites in 1950; they had six children. Sara died in 2005. In 2013, Di Stéfano's children won custody of him and his assets in order to prevent his planned wedding to Gina González, his Costa Rican secretary who was 50 years younger than him.

Career statistics

Club

International

Honours

Player

River Plate
Argentine Primera División: 1945, 1947
Copa Aldao: 1947

Millonarios
Categoría Primera A: 1949, 1951, 1952
Copa Colombia: 1953
Small Club World Cup: 1953

Real Madrid
La Liga: 1953–54, 1954–55, 1956–57, 1957–58, 1960–61, 1961–62, 1962–63, 1963–64
Copa del Generalísimo: 1961–62
European Cup: 1955–56, 1956–57, 1957–58, 1958–59, 1959–60
Latin Cup: 1955, 1957
Intercontinental Cup: 1960
Small Club World Cup: 1956

Argentina
South American Championship: 1947

Individual
Argentine Primera División top scorer: 1947
Campeonato Profesional top scorer: 1951, 1952
Pichichi Trophy: 1954, 1956, 1957, 1958, 1959
Ballon d'Or: 1957, 1959; runner-up: 1956
Super Ballon d'Or: 1989
 Small Club World Cup top scorer: 1956
European Cup top scorer: 1958, 1962
Spanish Player (Athlete) of the Year: 1957, 1959, 1960, 1964
FIFA Order of Merit: 1994
World Soccer World XI: 1960, 1961, 1962, 1963, 1964
World Team of the 20th Century: 1998
FIFA 100: 2004
UEFA Jubilee Awards – Golden Player of Spain: 2004
Golden Foot: 2004, as football legend
UEFA President's Award: 2007
World Soccer Greatest XI of all time: 2013
IFFHS Legends
 Ballon d'Or Dream Team (Silver): 2020
 11Leyendas Jornal AS: 2021
 IFFHS All-time Men's B Dream Team: 2021
IFFHS South America Men's Team of All Time: 2021

Manager
Boca Juniors
Primera División: 1969 Nacional
Copa Argentina: 1969

River Plate
Primera División: 1981 Nacional

Valencia
La Liga: 1970–71
European Cup Winners' Cup: 1979–80
Segunda División: 1986–87

Real Madrid
Supercopa de España: 1990

Records
Scored in most European Cup finals: five
Scored in most consecutive European Cup finals: five
Most goals scored in European Cup finals: seven (shared with Ferenc Puskás)
Only player to be awarded the Super Ballon d'Or

See also 

 List of men's footballers with 500 or more goals

References 
General
 (Autobiography) 

Specific

Further reading

External links

 Alfredo Di Stéfano at Real Madrid 
 
 Di Stéfano's high five UEFA.com
 Di Stéfano's golden memories UEFA.com
 Madrid salute Di Stéfano UEFA.com
 Spain national team stats from Sportec.es
 Detail of international appearances by RSSSF
 European Champions Cup/UEFA Champions League Winning Squads
 European Champions Cup/UEFA Champions League Winning Squads

UEFA Golden Players
1926 births
2014 deaths
Argentina international footballers
Argentine football managers
Argentine footballers
Argentine emigrants to Spain
Argentine expatriate footballers
Argentine expatriate sportspeople in Spain
Argentine people of Italian descent
Argentine people of Sicilian descent
Argentine people of Irish descent
Argentine people of French descent
Association football forwards
Boca Juniors managers
Catalonia international guest footballers
Categoría Primera A players
CD Castellón managers
Colombia international footballers
Dual internationalists (football)
Elche CF managers
Ballon d'Or winners
Expatriate football managers in Portugal
Expatriate footballers in Colombia
FIFA 100
Footballers from Buenos Aires
Club Atlético Huracán footballers
La Liga players
La Liga managers
Millonarios F.C. players
Naturalised citizens of Spain
Argentine Primera División players
Pichichi Trophy winners
Rayo Vallecano managers
RCD Espanyol footballers
Real Madrid CF managers
Real Madrid CF players
Club Atlético River Plate footballers
Club Atlético River Plate managers
Spanish football managers
Spanish footballers
Spanish people of Italian descent
Spanish people of French descent
Spanish people of Irish descent
Spain international footballers
Sporting CP managers
Valencia CF managers
Illustrious Citizens of Buenos Aires
Copa América-winning players
Burials at Cementerio de la Almudena
1962 FIFA World Cup players
UEFA Champions League winning players
UEFA Champions League top scorers
Sportspeople of Italian descent
Outfield association footballers who played in goal